Samba Meu (en: "My Samba") is Brazilian vocalist Maria Rita's third album, released in 2007 and distributed internationally by Warner Music Brazil.  It was Maria Rita's first album of samba music.  It won a 2008 Latin Grammy Award for Best Samba/Pagode album, and has been certified platinum in Brazil.

Track listing
"Samba Meu" (Rodrigo Bittencourt) – 2:09
"O Homem Falou" (Gonzaguinha) – 3:54
"Maltratar, Não é Direito" (Arlindo Cruz, Franco) – 3:44
"Num Corpo Só" (Arlindo Cruz, Picolé) – 3:58
"Cria" (Serginho Meriti, Cesar Belieny) – 3:33
"Tá Perdoado" (Franco, Arlindo Cruz) – 3:46
"Pra Declarar Minha Saudade" (Jr. Dom, Arlindo Cruz) – 1:40
"O Que é o Amor" (Arlindo Cruz, Maurição, Fred Camacho) – 3:39
"Trajetória" (Arlindo Cruz, Serginho Meriti, Franco) – 4:15
"Mente ao Meu Coração" (F. Malfitano) – 3:48
"Novo Amor" (Edu Krieger) – 2:55
"Maria do Socorro" (Edu Krieger) – 3:11
"Corpitcho" (Ronaldo Barcellos, Picolé) – 3:05
"Casa de Noca" (Serginho Meriti, Nei Jota Carlos, Elson Do Pagode) – 3:10

References

 Samba Meu [CD booklet] (2007). Miami Beach, FL: Warner Music Brazil.
 Translation from Samba Meu in the Portuguese-language Wikipedia.
 Chris White, "Samba Meu is just too polished and lacking in edge to make a real impact on the listener", BBC (21 November 2007).
 Jonathan Cunningham, "Maria Rita: Samba Meu" Miami New Times (17 January 2008).
 Latin Grammy Award Winners,  (search "Maria Rita" to verify award).

Maria Rita albums
2007 albums